"Bitemarks and Bloodstains" is a song by the American rock band Finch. It is the twelfth track on the band's second studio album Say Hello to Sunshine, and was released as a single on May 17, 2005 through Geffen Records. "Bitemarks and Bloodstains" was released to radio on June 21, 2005. It was subsequently released through other labels internationally in a variety of formats with various bonus tracks. Vocalist Nate Barcalow said "Bitemarks and Bloodstains" was the first song Finch wrote for Say Hello to Sunshine and it "makes the transition between the old and the new sound."

Music video
Finch released a music video directed by Michael Palmieri for "Bitemarks and Bloodstains" in July 2005. The video opens with an Emergency Alert System message and then shows various people in a single neighborhood frantically trying to pack up a car and evade a cataclysmic event, only to be stopped by a traffic jam. In the end of the video, a mysterious cosmic event occurs causing all people from the neighborhood to vanish without a trace. The plot of the video is interspliced with footage of Finch performing in a living room.

Reception
"Bitemarks and Bloodstains" was met with an average to negative reception by music critics. Writing for AbsolutePunk, Scott Weber said the song, "doesn't even sound like new Finch. It's completely boring and predictable. The build-up, while intended to be dramatic, is murdered by the chorus being repeated over and over again." Writing for Sputnikmusic, Ryan Flatley said, "Songs such as 'A Piece of Mind,' 'Brother Bleed Brother,' and 'Bitemarks and Bloodstains' are all good songs, just nothing blares out in me that makes it individually great."

Track listings

Digital single
 "Bitemarks and Bloodstains"

CD single
 "Bitemarks and Bloodstains"
 "Worms of the Earth" (remix)
 "Bitemarks and Bloodstains" (music video)

CD promo single
 "Bitemarks and Bloodstains" (radio edit)
 "Bitemarks and Bloodstains" (album version)

UK 7" vinyl single #1
 "Bitemarks and Bloodstains"
 "Worms of the Earth" (remix)

UK 7" vinyl single #2
 "Bitemarks and Bloodstains"
 "What It Is to Burn" (BBC Radio 1 session)

References

2005 singles
Finch (American band) songs
2005 songs
Geffen Records singles
Songs written by Nate Barcalow